Madame Louise is a 1945 comedy play by the British writer Vernon Sylvaine.

It premiered at His Majesty's Theatre in Aberdeen and then went on to a long West End run at the Garrick Theatre, lasting for 410 performances between February 1945 and February 1946. The original cast included Robertson Hare, Alfred Drayton and Paul Demel.

Film adaptation

In 1951 the play served as a loose basis for a film adaptation made at Walton Studios. Neither of the original stars appeared in the film version, which was rewritten to suit different actors.

References

Bibliography
 Wearing, J.P. The London Stage 1940-1949: A Calendar of Productions, Performers, and Personnel.  Rowman & Littlefield, 2014.

1945 plays
British plays adapted into films
Plays by Vernon Sylvaine
Comedy plays
West End plays